Manuchar Machaidze (Manuchar Domentyevich Machaidze; born 25 March 1949) is a Georgian former footballer who played as a midfielder for Dinamo Tbilisi, Pakhtakor Tashkent, Spartak Moscow and Torpedo Kutaisi during his club career, and is most famous for his time at Dinamo Tbilisi, which were a powerful and successful club – ever present at the highest level of Soviet football, where he won numerous accolades. His younger brother, Gocha Machaidze, also a footballer, served as a prolific defender and defensive midfielder for the same clubs as him.

A deep-lying playmaker, who was also operated in the classic number 7 position, Machaidze is the only player in the Georgian football history, who lifted the Soviet Crystal Cup as captain twice, first when in 1976 the Georgians made a remarkable performance, winning their first trophy after a smashing 3–0 victory against Ararat Yerevan in the final and second, when after the goalless draw Dinamo Tbilisi defeated Dynamo Moscow 5–4 on penalties in 1979.

Many sport journalists and football specialists not just in Georgia and former Soviet Union but internationally still consider him among the best Georgian and Soviet football players of its time. He was noted for his organizational ability, intelligence, technical skills, and exceptional stamina. By many football experts and observers he is still regarded also as the most productive captain of Dinamo Tbilisi when measured solely by the number of major trophies won. With one Soviet Top League title, two Soviet Cups and significant results in the national championship as well as the local and international  recognition or achievements at various tournaments. Besides all the above-mentioned during his period Dinamo Tbilisi became the  Vice-Champion in 1977 and won Soviet Top League silver medals. Also four times took the third place and won bronze medals as well as became the Vice-Champion of the football tournament of the Summer Spartakiad of Peoples of the Soviet Union in 1979.

From 1995 to 1999 he was a member of the Parliament of Georgia. In Georgia, he is also known as an amateur artist

26 March 2013 in appreciation for his lifelong service to one's country and in recognition of his outstanding contribution over many years in Georgian Sport, on the basis of a decision by Ministry of Sport and Youth Affairs of Georgia he was awarded Highest Sports Title of Georgia — "Knight of Sport".

Early years
Machaidze was born in Ambrolauri. But the family lived there only briefly and moved to an apartment house in Tbilisi when he was three. 
He started playing football at the age of 12 in Tbilisi. Local well-known specialist Vano Shudra was Machaidze's first coach. His supreme football talent was soon obvious in the 35th Football School boys team he played in.

Club career

Dinamo Tbilisi
His football career really started to take off from 1967, when Vyacheslav Solovyov — senior then coach of Dinamo Tbilisi noticed this impressive young player and invited him to join the club's reserve team. Machaidze was 18 years old when he played his first game in a Dinamo shirt. He played with the reserves for the whole of 1968 and 1969 seasons and scored 11 goals in 47 games. Machaidze played his first senior game for Dinamo on 1 June 1968 in Tashkent when he was a second-half substitute in their 0–0 draw with Pakhtakor in the 11th round of the Soviet Top League.

He became a regular player in the first team by the 1970 season, playing 18 league games for the club. In that year he also made his Soviet Cup tournament debut in the final game against Dynamo Moscow. The match was held at the Luzhniki Stadium in Moscow on 8 August 1970. More than 100 000 spectators attended this historical game, which was the last Soviet Cup final for the legendary Lev Yashin, considered by many to be the greatest goalkeeper in the history of the game. It was the second cup final between the two teams (the first one was also held in Moscow on 16 July 1937). The home team won the match 2–1. Russian Striker Vladimir Eshtrekov scored the first goal at 17th minute and it stayed at 1–0 until half-time. After the break, Gennady Yevryuzhikhin doubled Dynamo Moscow's lead at 17th minute of the second half. Five minutes later Georgian defender Shota Khinchagashvili pulled a goal back at 67th minute — 2–1. This was how it remained until the end of the match, and Muscovites were able to celebrate their fourth Soviet Cup victory.

The following year, Machaidze played all 30 league games, scored 5 goals and won with the club his first domestic honour — Soviet Top League Bronze medal.

International career

Machaidze was capped four times for the Soviet Union, between April 1974 and May 1979. He made his international debut under manager Konstantin Beskov, on 17 April 1974, in a friendly international match, when the Soviet Union beat Yugoslavia 1–0. He played his last national team game on 19 May 1979 in a UEFA Euro 1980 qualifier against Hungary.

Career statistics

Club

International

Honours

Club

Dinamo Tbilisi
Soviet Top League: 1978
Soviet Cup (2): 1976, 1979

References

External links
 
 
 
 
 Article at GeorgianJournal.ge
 
 Article at FC Dinamo Tbilisi Official Club Site
 Article at Worldsport.ge 
 Articles at Sport-Express.ru      
 Profile at Rusteam.Permian.ru    
 Profile at Footballplayers.ru
 Profile at Allfutbolist.ru
 Profile and statistics at Klisf.net
 

1949 births
Living people
Footballers from Georgia (country)
Soviet footballers
Soviet Union international footballers
FC Torpedo Kutaisi players
FC Dinamo Tbilisi players
FC Spartak Moscow players
Pakhtakor Tashkent FK players
Soviet Top League players
Members of the Parliament of Georgia
Association football midfielders